The 2013 Bitburger Open Grand Prix Gold was the fourteenth Grand Prix Gold and Grand Prix tournament of the 2013 BWF Grand Prix Gold and Grand Prix. The tournament was held in Saarlandhalle, Saarbrücken, Germany October 29 until November 3, 2013 and had a total purse of $120,000.

Men's singles

Seeds

  Marc Zwiebler (final)
  Hans-Kristian Vittinghus (first round)
  Rajiv Ouseph (third round)
  Chou Tien-chen (champion)
  Anand Pawar (third round)
  Tan Chun Seang (second round)
  Ville Lang (quarter-final)
  Sai Praneeth (withdrew)
  Suppanyu Avihingsanon (semi-final)
  Henri Hurskainen (third round)
  Brice Leverdez (withdrew)
  Scott Evans (quarter-final)
  Dmytro Zavadsky (quarter-final)
  Dieter Domke (third round)
  Misha Zilberman (third round)
  Vladimir Malkov (first round)

Finals

Top half

Section 1

Section 2

Section 3

Section 4

Bottom half

Section 5

Section 6

Section 7

Section 8

Women's singles

Seeds

  Nichaon Jindapon (champion)
  Carolina Marin (withdrew)
  Kirsty Gilmour (semi-final)
  Beatriz Corrales (quarter-final)
  Linda Zechiri (final)
  Sashina Vignes Waran (quarter-final)
  Karin Schnaase (second round)
  Chloe Magee (quarter-final)

Finals

Top half

Section 1

Section 2

Bottom half

Section 3

Section 4

Men's doubles

Seeds

  Maneepong Jongjit / Nipitphon Puangpuapech (second round)
  Chris Adcock / Andrew Ellis (second round)
  Chris Langridge / Peter Mills (quarter-final)
  Adam Cwalina / Przemyslaw Wacha (first round)
  Marcus Ellis /  Paul Van Rietvelde (withdrew)
  Wannawat Ampunsuwan / Patiphat Chalardchaleam (quarter-final)
  Michael Fuchs / Johannes Schoettler (quarter-final)
  Jacco Arends / Jelle Maas (semi-final)

Finals

Top half

Section 1

Section 2

Bottom half

Section 3

Section 4

Women's doubles

Seeds

  Birgit Michels / Johanna Goliszewski (quarter-final)
  Heather Olver / Kate Robertshaw (semi-final)
  Gabrielle White / Lauren Smith (quarter-final)
  Ng Hui Ern / Ng Hui Lin (final)

Finals

Top half

Section 1

Section 2

Bottom half

Section 3

Section 4

Mixed doubles

Seeds

  Michael Fuchs / Birgit Michels (champion)
  Chris Adcock / Gabrielle White (final)
  Anders Kristiansen / Julie Houmann (second round)
  Chris Langridge / Heather Olver (semi-final)
  Robert Blair / Imogen Bankier (first round)
  Tarun Kona / Ashwini Ponnappa (first round)
  Sam Magee / Chloe Magee (second round)
  Peter Kaesbauer / Isabel Herttrich (quarter-final)

Finals

Top half

Section 1

Section 2

Bottom half

Section 3

Section 4

References

2013 in German sport
Sport in Saarbrücken
Bitburger Open Grand Prix Gold
SaarLorLux Open